Demos is a 1921 silent British drama film directed by Denison Clift. The film is considered to be lost.

Cast 
 Milton Rosmer as Richard Mortimer
 Evelyn Brent as Emma Vine
 Warwick Ward as Willis Rodman
 Bettina Campbell as Adela Waltham
 Olaf Hytten as Daniel Dabbs
 Gerald McCarthy as Herbert Eldon
 Mary Brough as Mrs.Mortimer
 Haidee Wright as Mrs. Eldon
 Vivian Gibson as Alice Mortimer
 Daisy Campbell as Mrs. Waltham
 James G. Butt as Jim Cullen
 Leonard Robson as Longwood

References

External links 

1921 films
1921 drama films
British drama films
British silent feature films
British black-and-white films
Films directed by Denison Clift
Lost British films
Ideal Film Company films
1920s British films
Silent drama films